Neoguraleus filiferus is an extinct species of sea snail, a marine gastropod mollusk in the family Mangeliidae.

Description

Distribution
This extinct marine species is endemic to Australia and occurs in Late Eocene strata in Western Australia.

References

External links
  Darragh, T. A. (2017). Further Mollusca from the late Eocene Pallinup Formation, Eucla Basin, Western Australia. Records of the West Australian Museum 32: 29-100

filiferus
Gastropods described in 2017
Gastropods of Australia